Abhijit Adsul is an Indian politician and member of the Shiv Sena. He was elected to Maharashtra Legislative Assembly in 2009 from the  Daryapur Vidhan Sabha constituency in Amravati District.

Positions held
 2009: Elected to Maharashtra Legislative Assembly
 2015: Elected as Director of Mumbai District Central Co-operative Bank Ltd.

References 

Shiv Sena politicians
Members of the Maharashtra Legislative Assembly
Living people
Marathi politicians
Year of birth missing (living people)